Mokvi is a village in Abkhazia, Georgia. Located on the Mokvi river. Its elevation above sea level is around 130 m, the distance to Ochamchire is 17 km. As of 2011 the population was 939. Mokvi is home to the  built in 10th century by Abkhazian king Leon III.

See also
 Ochamchira District

References 

Populated places in Ochamchira District
Sukhum Okrug